Onari is an Island and municipality in the state of Chuuk, Federated States of Micronesia. It is located 8°45'12.4"N 150°20'20.5"E.

References
Statoids.com, retrieved December 8, 2010

Municipalities of Chuuk State